Cora strigosa is a species of basidiolichen in the family Hygrophoraceae. Found in Peru, it was formally described as a new species in 2013 by Robert Lücking, Elias Paz, and Luis Salcedo. Here, in montane rainforest and pasture near Machu Picchu, the lichen grows on rocks together with other lichens, such as Hypotrachyna and Rimelia. Cora strigosa is only known to occur at the type locality. The specific epithet strigosa refers to the strigose (i.e., with dense, short, hair-like projections) upper surface of the thallus, especially prominent where they project radially at the margins. This lichen resembles Cora hirsuta, but it is not closely related.

References

strigosa
Lichen species
Lichens described in 2013
Lichens of Peru
Taxa named by Robert Lücking
Basidiolichens